Japanese missions to Paekche represent an aspect of the international relations of mutual Paekche-Japanese contacts and communication.  The bilateral exchanges were intermittent.

The unique nature of these bilateral diplomatic exchanges evolved from a conceptual framework developed by the Chinese.

 369-375 — Yamato Japan and Paekche maintain yearly exchanges of ambassadors.
 
According to the Nihon Shoki, in the years 501-700 Japan sent 328 official missions to Paekche, 316 to Silla, 146 to Goguryeo, 193 to Imna (Mimana), 20 to Gaya, 20 to Tamna, and 5 to Samhan kingdoms. Exchanges of embassies with the Korean kingdoms of Paekche and Silla were critical for informing the Japanese of cultural developments on the continent.

See also
 Japanese missions to Silla
 Japanese missions to Joseon
 Japanese missions to Imperial China

Notes

References
  Hyung Il Pai. (2000). Constructing "Korean" Origins: a Critical Review of Archaeology, Historiography, and Racial Myth in Korean State-Formation Theories.  Cambridge: Harvard University Press. ;  OCLC 42772182
 Kang, Etsuko Hae-jin. (1997). Diplomacy and Ideology in Japanese-Korean Relations: from the Fifteenth to the Eighteenth Century. Basingstoke, Hampshire; Macmillan. ; 
 Nussbaum, Louis-Frédéric and Käthe Roth. (2005).  Japan encyclopedia. Cambridge: Harvard University Press. ;  OCLC 58053128

Diplomacy